Alois Knabl (born 16 May 1992) is an Austrian triathlete. He competed in the men's event at the 2020 Summer Olympics. However, he was not able to finish due a mechanical problem during the cycling segment of the race. He was also scheduled to compete in the mixed relay event but the Austrian team did not start.

In 2010, he won the bronze medal in the boys' triathlon at the 2010 Summer Youth Olympics held in Singapore. He also won the gold medal in the mixed relay event.

References

External links
 

1992 births
Living people
Austrian male triathletes
Olympic triathletes of Austria
Triathletes at the 2010 Summer Youth Olympics
Triathletes at the 2020 Summer Olympics
Sportspeople from Innsbruck
21st-century Austrian people